Sin'gye station is a railway station for Singye County, North Hwanghae Province, North Korea.

References 

Railway stations in North Korea
Buildings and structures in North Hwanghae Province